The Einstein Theory of Relativity (1923) is a silent animated short film directed by Dave Fleischer and released by Fleischer Studios.

History
In August 1922, Scientific American published an article explaining their position that a silent film would be unsuccessful in presenting the theory of relativity to the general public, arguing that only as part of a broader educational package including lecture and text would such film be successful. Scientific American then went on to review frames from an unnamed German film reported to be financially successful.

Six months later, on February 8, 1923, the Fleischers released their relativity film, produced in collaboration with popular science journalist Garrett P. Serviss to accompany his book on the same topic. Two versions of the Fleischer film are reported to exist – a shorter two-reel (20 minute) edit intended for general theater audiences, and a longer five-reel (50 minute) version intended for educational use.

The Fleischers lifted footage from the German predecessor, Die Grundlagen der Einsteinschen Relativitäts-Theorie, directed by Hanns-Walter Kornblum, for inclusion into their film. Presented here are images from the Fleischer film and German film. If actual footage was not recycled into The Einstein Theory of Relativity, these images and text from the Scientific American article suggest that original visual elements from the German film were.

This film, like much of the Fleischer's work, has fallen into the public domain. Unlike Fleischer Studio's Superman or Betty Boop cartoons, The Einstein Theory of Relativity has very few existing prints and is available in 16mm from only a few specialized film preservation organizations.

References

External links
 
The Einstein Theory of Relativity at Vimeo
The Einstein Theory of Relativity DVD of the film bundled with guidebook by Garrett P. Serviss (and including another Fleischer documentary, Evolution), from Apogee Books, .

1920s animated short films
Fleischer Studios short films
1923 animated films
American silent short films
American black-and-white films
1920s American animated films
1923 films
Short films directed by Dave Fleischer
Theory of relativity
1920s educational films
1923 short films
1923 documentary films
American educational films